Mafadi is a peak on the border of South Africa and Lesotho.

By the Himalayan definition of a mountain, being a summit with at least 7% topographic prominence relative to height, Mafadi is not in fact a mountain summit, but rather a subsidiary summit of Makheka in Lesotho. By this definition, Champagne Castle is the highest mountain summit in South Africa, although Mafadi is unquestionably the highest point in South Africa.

Ascent

Hiking
Ascents of Mafadi, attempted from the South African side, are normally made from the Njesuthi campsite. The Njesuthi escarpment of the Drakensberg is one of the more remote hiking regions, and normally takes two days to reach the escarpment. The route involves about an  hike to Marble Baths. This is followed by continuing up the river and with a combination of short paths and boulder hopping.  This all ends at the bottom of the ridge, which leads to the Molar, with a campsite.  The subsequent path up the ridge to the top of the mountains is known as Leslie's Pass.  The path follows the ridge until below a rocky band where it traverses to southern side.  The way continues up a short scree section, followed by more hiking up a quite steep gradient, until the final  are made up a grassy slope.  From here, the top of Leslie's Pass follows, and a spectacular hike up the ridge connecting Lithobolong and Mafadi.

A route referred to as the Corner-Leslies Loop is becoming a popular way of reaching Mafadi. It entails hiking to Centenary Hut in Injisuthi Nature Reserve on day 1, ascending Corner Pass and climbing Mafadi on day 2, descending Leslie's Pass to Marble Baths on day 3, and returning to the Njesuthi campsite on day.

Running
On 8 October 2015, South African trail runners Ryan Sandes and Ryno Griesel set a Fastest Known Time (FKT) for the ascent of Mafadi via the Northern High Approach, an alternative, and slightly shorter but steeper route of the popular Corner's pass. The previous FKT was set in 2012 by fellow South African, Andrew Porter, with a time of 6 h 22 min from the Giant's Castle campsite via Judge pass.

Disputed name 
The name of Mafadi (which literally means the Mother of Fadi) is currently under dispute, its original Sotho name Ntheledi (which means "Makes me slip", referring to the nearby stream) being considered by some to be more relevant and correct.

See also
List of mountains in South Africa

References

External links 

Mafadi, South Africa/Lesotho
 Mafadi Peak Photograph
 Lynx Africa: Trails Lesotho South Africa
 Guided Ascents of Mafadi* 
 Thabana Ntlenyana

Drakensberg
Highest points of countries
International mountains of Africa
Lesotho–South Africa border
Mountains of KwaZulu-Natal
Mountains of Lesotho